Robert Apisa (born June 4, 1945) is an American actor and former football fullback. He played college football at Michigan State University.

Early years
Apisa, one of eleven children, was born in American Samoa. His parents moved the family to Hawaii when he was seven. He didn't start playing football until entering the ninth grade at Farrington High School. He also practiced baseball and track.

Career

College career 
He accepted a football scholarship from Michigan State University. He was named a starter at fullback as a sophomore, registering 126 carries for 715 yards (second on the team and third in the conference), a 5.7-yard average and 10 touchdowns. At the end of the season, he was limited with injuries, but still was able to become the first player of Samoan ancestry to be named All-American. He required off-season knee surgery.

On November 19, 1966, he was a part of the contest played against the University of Notre Dame called "The Game of the Century", which ended in a 10–10 tie. It was also the first ever live television sports broadcast in Hawaii. He had 140 rushing yards and one touchdown against the University of Michigan. He suffered a knee injury in the seventh game against Northwestern University and missed most of the remaining contests. He posted 86 carries for 445 yards (5.2-yard avg.) and 9 touchdowns.

As a senior, he struggled to recover from off-season knee surgery. He tallied only 50 carries for 183 yards during the season. Besides being a notable blocker, he finished his college career as the school's all-time leading rushing fullback with 1,343 yards. He was a part of 2 national championship teams (1965 and 1966).

In 2017, he was inducted into the Michigan State Athletics Hall of Fame. In 2018, he was inducted into the Polynesian Football Hall of Fame.

Professional career 
Apisa was selected by the Green Bay Packers in the ninth round (245th overall) of the 1968 NFL Draft. He was waived on July 30.

Acting 
After retiring from professional football, Apisa spent more than 33 years working as a character actor and stunt coordinator in television series and films.

Personal life
Apisa's grandson, Jacob Isaia, is an offensive lineman for Michigan State University and California State University, Fresno.

Filmography

Film

Television

References

External links
Bob Apisa's journey from American Samoa to Michigan State Hall of Fame

1945 births
Living people
People from Pago Pago
Players of American football from American Samoa
American football fullbacks
Michigan State Spartans football players
American stunt performers
American male television actors
American sportspeople of Samoan descent
Actors of Samoan descent